The 2009–10 English Hockey League season took place from September 2009 until May 2010. The Men's Championship was won by East Grinstead and the Women's Championship was won by Slough.

The Men's Cup was won by Beeston and the Women's Cup was won by Leicester.

Men's Premier Division League Standings

Results

Play Offs

Women's Premier Division League Standings

Play Offs

Men's Cup

Quarter-finals

Semi-finals

Final 
(Held at the Highfields Hockey Centre, Nottingham on 15 May)

Women's Cup

Quarter-finals

Semi-finals

Final 
(Held at Highfields Hockey Centre, Nottingham on 15 May)

References 

England Hockey League seasons
field hockey
field hockey
England